Guntersville (previously known as Gunter's Ferry and later Gunter's Landing) is a city and the county seat of Marshall County, Alabama, United States. At the 2020 census, the population of the city was 8,553. Guntersville is located in a HUBZone as identified by the U.S. Small Business Administration (SBA).

History
Guntersville was founded by John Gunter (1765–1835), the great-grandfather of American humorist Will Rogers. Gunter's own great-great-grandfather, of Welsh-English descent, had emigrated to the New World in 1644. Gunter was the wealthy owner of a salt mine in the early 19th century. In order to obtain more land to mine, Gunter struck a deal with the Cherokee tribe that inhabited the area to use in his household as servants. As part of the deal, Gunter married the daughter (Ghe-No-He-Li, aka Katy and Cathrine) of the tribe's chief (Chief Bushyhead of the Paint Clan) and agreed to give salt to the tribe. A town sprung up next to the mine and was named after Gunter. The town of Guntersville puts on a festival every July to celebrate Will Rogers, which involves many activities which were of interest to Rogers.

Initially incorporated as "Gunter's Landing" in 1848, it won the contest to become county seat from Warrenton (which had been the seat since 1841). It formally changed its name to Guntersville in 1854.

The United States Navy began operating a fleet of gunboats on the Tennessee River in late 1864. Confederate troops mounted a spirited defense of the river from Guntersville. In January 1865, the USS General Grant attempted to destroy the town in retaliation.

For much of the 20th century, the economy of Guntersville revolved around cotton processing, especially with the Saratoga Victory Mill.

Geography
Guntersville is located in central Marshall County at  (34.348197, −86.294523). U.S. Route 431 (Gunter Avenue and Blount Avenue) is the main road through the city, leading northwest  to Huntsville, and southeast  to Albertville.

Guntersville is located at the southernmost point of the Tennessee River on Lake Guntersville, formed by the Guntersville Dam (built by the Tennessee Valley Authority). Geologically, the lake occupies a southern extension of the Sequatchie Valley, which continues south as Browns Valley.

Climate

Demographics

2000 census
At the 2000 census, there were 7,395 people, 3,061 households and 1,971 families living in the city. The racial makeup of the city was 88.17% White, 8.53% Black or African American, 0.49% Native American, 0.41% Asian, 0.01% Pacific Islander, 0.95% from other races, and 1.45% from two or more races. 2.87% of the population were Hispanic or Latino of any race.

There were 3,061 households, of which 27.5% had children under the age of 18 living with them, 47.5% were married couples living together, 13.7% had a female householder with no husband present, and 35.6% were non-families. 32.4% of all households were made up of individuals, and 14.4% had someone living alone who was 65 years of age or older. The average household size was 2.28 and the average family size was 2.88.

Age distribution was 22.4% under the age of 18, 7.1% from 18 to 24, 27.0% from 25 to 44, 24.3% from 45 to 64, and 19.2% who were 65 years of age or older. The median age was 41 years. For every 100 females, there were 88.8 males. For every 100 females age 18 and over, there were 84.8 males.

The median household income was $29,882, and the median family income was $39,464. Males had a median income of $36,175 versus $20,480 for females. The per capita income for the city was $18,503. About 11.2% of families and 14.2% of the population were below the poverty line, including 15.2% of those under age 18 and 16.3% of those age 65 or over.

2010 census
At the 2010 census, there were 8,197 people, 3,388 households and 2,167 families living in the city. The racial makeup of the city was 85.8% White, 7.8% Black or African American, 0.5% Native American, 1.5% Asian, 0.0% Pacific Islander, 2.5% from other races, and 1.9% from two or more races. 3.8% of the population were Hispanic or Latino of any race.

There were 3,388 households, of which 25.3% had children under the age of 18 living with them, 45.9% were married couples living together, 13.8% had a female householder with no husband present, and 36.0% were non-families. 31.8% of all households were made up of individuals, and 14.3% had someone living alone who was 65 years of age or older. The average household size was 2.29 and the average family size was 2.87.

Age distribution was 21.0% under the age of 18, 7.4% from 18 to 24, 22.8% from 25 to 44, 28.6% from 45 to 64, and 20.2% who were 65 years of age or older. The median age was 43.9 years. For every 100 females, there were 92.5 males. For every 100 females age 18 and over, there were 96.8 males.

The median household income was $38,094, and the median family income was $57,610. Males had a median income of $39,063 versus $31,410 for females. The per capita income for the city was $23,468. About 16.9% of families and 20.5% of the population were below the poverty line, including 34.9% of those under age 18 and 19.1% of those age 65 or over.

2020 census

As of the 2020 United States census, there were 8,553 people, 3,312 households, and 2,179 families residing in the city.

Recreation
Guntersville sits on the shore of  Guntersville Lake, the biggest lake in Alabama. The lake is maintained and managed by the Tennessee Valley Authority. The 2014 and 2020 Bassmaster Classic were held on Guntersville Lake.

Government
The current mayor is Leigh Dollar, the daughter of a previous mayor, and the first female to hold mayor's office in Guntersville.

Education
Guntersville has one school system in the town which is made up of four schools; Guntersville Elementary School (Kindergarten-2nd grade), Cherokee Elementary School (3rd–5th grade), Guntersville Middle School (6th–8th grade), and Guntersville High School (9th–12th grade). In 2006 Guntersville High School won the 4A football state championship, which is the only football state championship recorded by a school in Marshall County, Alabama.

Culture
Guntersville was the last place in which Ricky Nelson ever performed as a singer. His last performance was at PJ's Alley in Guntersville on Monday, December 30, 1985. His private plane departed Guntersville the next day, New Year's Eve, and crashed near DeKalb, Texas.

In Hunting Mister Heartbreak: A Discovery of America, the British author Jonathan Raban becomes a temporary resident of the city, to which he takes a liking in his conservative persona as John Rayburn. He is aware, however, that were his real views known the people of Guntersville might have been less welcoming. "Scratch John Rayburn, and he'd confess my own thoughts on politics, books, religion − thoughts that wouldn't wash in Guntersville."

Notable people
 Don Fuell, former Canadian Football League quarterback
 "Mississippi" Bill Harris, entrepreneur
 Jon Jefferson, documentary filmmaker and author
 M. E. Lazarus, American individualist anarchist
 Jeffrey McLaughlin, former member of the Alabama Legislature from the 27th district
 Jeanette Scissum, NASA sunspot predictor
 Willard Scissum, former offensive tackle for the Washington Redskins and coach at Savannah State University
 Joe Starnes, congressman from 1935 to 1945
Conrad Thompson, podcast host
 Pat Upton, former lead singer and songwriter with Spiral Starecase

References

External links
 
 Lake Guntersville Chamber of Commerce
 Marshall County Economic Development Council

Cities in Alabama
Cities in Marshall County, Alabama
Huntsville-Decatur, AL Combined Statistical Area
County seats in Alabama
Alabama populated places on the Tennessee River
Populated places inundated by the Tennessee Valley Authority